Sir William Taylor Money (1769 – April 1834) was an English naval captain in the East India Company, superintendent of the Bombay Marine and MP in the British Parliament.

Early life
He was the eldest son of Captain William Money of Wood End House, Walthamstow, a director of the East India Company for 1789–96, and Martha, the daughter of James Taylor.

Career
Money was commissioned in the East India Company navy as a lieutenant in the Rose in 1786 and in 1793 he became commander of the General Goddard belonging to Sir Robert Wigram, 1st Baronet, his father's business partner. After a successful initial voyage he was given the command of other Wigram ships including the Walthamstow. On his retirement from sea in 1801 he became the East India Company Marine Superintendent at Bombay, a post he held until 1810.

During this period he served as president of the Asiatic Society of Bombay from 1815. He also gave his name to Money Island in the Paracel Islands group in the South China Sea which was named after him by the British naval surveyor Captain Daniel Ross.

On his return to England he established a home in Streatham Park, Surrey and became a Director of the East India Company from 1818 to 1826. He entered Parliament as the member for Wootton Bassett from 1816 to 1820 and for Mitchell from 1820 to 1826. He gave up his Parliamentary seat in March 1826 when appointed consul to the Lombard states but died of cholera in Venice in April 1834.

He was elected a Fellow of the Royal Society in 1818. and invested a Knight of the Royal Guelphic Order in 1831.

Private life
He had married Eugenia, the daughter of William Money of Homme House, Much Marcle, Herefordshire, with whom he had 7 sons and 2 daughters. He left all his property to his wife in trust for their children, but his estate in Java had to be sold to pay his debts. Several of his children and grandchildren also served in the Indian army or civil service.

References

1769 births
1834 deaths
British East India Company civil servants
Members of the Parliament of the United Kingdom for English constituencies
UK MPs 1812–1818
UK MPs 1818–1820
UK MPs 1820–1826
Fellows of the Royal Society
Deaths from cholera